Aegilops neglecta, common name three-awn goat grass, is a species in the family Poaceae.

References 
 
 Brummitt, R. K. 1986. Report of the Committee for Spermatophyta. Taxon 35:557.
 Davis, P. H., ed. 1965–1988. Flora of Turkey and the east Aegean islands.
 El Bouhssini, M. et al. 1998. Identification in Aegilops species of resistant sources to Hessian fly (Diptera: Cecidomyiidae). Genet. Resources Crop Evol. 45:343–345.
 FNA Editorial Committee. 1993–. Flora of North America.
 Kimber, G. & M. Feldman. 1987. Wild wheat, an introduction.
 Lambinon, J. 1981. (588) Proposition de rejet Aegilops ovata L. Taxon 30:361.
 Slageren, M. W. van. 1994. Wild wheats: a monograph of Aegilops L. and Amblyopyrum (Jaub. & Spach) Eig. Agric. Univ. Wageningen Pap. 94–7:266.
 Tutin, T. G. et al., eds. 1964–1980. Flora europaea.)
 Tzvelev, N. N. 1976. Zlaki SSSR.

External links

neglecta
Flora of Western Asia